Notoaeschna is a genus of dragonflies in the family Telephlebiidae,
endemic to south-eastern Australia.

Species of Notoaeschna are large, dark brown to black dragonflies with yellow markings.

Species
The genus Notoaeschna includes the following species:

Notoaeschna geminata  – northern riffle darner
Notoaeschna sagittata  – southern riffle darner

See also
 List of Odonata species of Australia

References

Telephlebiidae
Anisoptera genera
Odonata of Australia
Endemic fauna of Australia
Taxa named by Robert John Tillyard
Insects described in 1916